Grandis, Inc. was founded in 2002 by Bill Almon and Yiming Huai. It was backed by venture capital firms such as Sevin Rosen Funds and Matrix Partners to pioneer non-volatile solutions based on spintronics. The solutions it developed were thin-film memory, which included the invention of spin transfer torque - random access memory (STT-RAM).

History
Grandis, Inc. was founded in Milpitas, CA in 2002 by Bill Almon and Yiming Huai  in establishing and maintaining strategic partnerships with important partners such as Hynix and Renesas.

Grandis invented the first spin-transfer torque thin film structures based on magnetic tunnel junctions and quickly became the leader in the STT-RAM space.  In 2011, Grandis was acquired by Samsung Electronics Co., Ltd and merged into Samsung's memory operations.

Products and technologies
Grandis supplies thin film memory devices. The company is also a licensor of magnetoresistive random-access memory (MRAM) process and design technology to fabless semiconductor companies, wafer foundries, and integrated device manufacturers. Target applications include storage, telecommunications, mobile devices, and computer networking.

Grandis technology sought to address the problems of write selectivity and speed, low read signal, and thermal stability from which other products in the Magnetic Random Access Memory (MRAM) industry suffered.

Investors
Grandis's capital investors included Matrix Partners, Sevin Rosen Partners, and Applied Materials Ventures. The acquisition by Samsung resulted in a very successful exit for Grandis's investors.

References

Fabless semiconductor companies
Computer memory companies
Companies based in Sunnyvale, California
Semiconductor companies of the United States